State Road 406 (SR 406), also known as Garden Street, is an east–west road in northern Titusville that connects Interstate 95 (I-95 or SR 9) to U.S. Route 1 (US 1 or SR 5). West of I-95, Garden Street is unsigned County Road 406 (CR 406), with its western terminus at Carpenter Road. East of US 1, it becomes A. Max Brewer Memorial Parkway, part of the Indian River Lagoon Scenic Highway.

Major intersections

References

External links

406
406